On 25 May 2022, at least 5 people were killed when the Hazrat Zakaria Mosque in Kabul, Afghanistan, was bombed. At least 17 others were injured. The cause of the bombing was an improvised explosive device that had been hidden inside the mosque prior to the bombing. It detonated during the Maghrib prayers.

An anonymous Taliban official told reporters that at least fourteen were killed, including the imam. This has not yet been verified. The same day, at least nine were killed in three bombings which targeted minivans in Mazar-i-Sharif, Balkh Province.

The United Arab Emirates condemned the attack as a terrorist action.

See also 
 Terrorist incidents in Afghanistan in 2022
 List of terrorist attacks in Kabul

References 

2022 murders in Afghanistan
2020s crimes in Kabul
21st-century mass murder in Afghanistan
Attacks on religious buildings and structures in Afghanistan
Attacks on Shiite mosques
Improvised explosive device bombings in Afghanistan
Improvised explosive device bombings in 2022
Mass murder in 2022
Mass murder in Kabul
May 2022 crimes in Asia
May 2022 events in Afghanistan
Mosque bombings in Asia
Terrorist incidents in Afghanistan in 2022
Terrorist incidents in Kabul